Ryan Spendlove is an English singer-songwriter, born in Gawthorpe, West Yorkshire, signed to the American-based record label CandyRat Records. He was the former singer and guitarist of The Blueskins who had international success. Since going solo after their split in 2008, Spendlove has performed extensively in the UK and the US and recorded two studio albums.

Musical career
Spendlove is proficient in vocals, guitar, and ukulele. He has performed in bands since the age of 18. Notably he formed the band The Blueskins
He has joined several established artists on tour dates: Andy McKee and Ewan Dobson. In 2011, his début solo 12 track album, Fable, was released. Spendlove recorded all the tracks in three days in a live studio setting during the sessions in Chicago and Milwaukee.

In 2012 his follow up, In Another World, was released again on the CandyRat Records label.

Musical influences
Spendlove is influenced from a wide range of music starting from his early childhood, including The Beatles. Blues, folk and gospel influences are all elements found within in his music.

Discography

Albums
Fable (2011)
In Another World (2012)

References

External links
 Artist profile on CandyRat Records

Year of birth missing (living people)
Living people
English male singer-songwriters
English blues guitarists
English folk guitarists